Johan Svedberg (born February 14, 1980) is a Swedish former professional ice hockey defenceman who played in the Swedish Hockey League for Timrå IK and Leksands IF.

Playing career 
On April 2, 2004, Johan signed with Timrå IK for one year. Later the same year, on October 27, 2004 Svedberg was named the first in the line of four candidates for Elitserien Rookie Of The Year 2005. The award was eventually won by the forward Oscar Steen. After the rookie season, his contract was extended to 2006–07 on April 8, 2005.

On May 8, 2007, following his third season with Timrå, the defenceman joined IF Björklöven in Allsvenskan, a team he stayed with for three seasons before moving on to Leksands IF after the regulation of Björklöven to Division 1 due to financial difficulties.

Awards 
Elitserien 2004–05 Rookie of the Year Nominee in 2004.

References

External links 

1980 births
IF Björklöven players
Leksands IF players
Living people
IF Sundsvall Hockey players
Timrå IK players
Swedish ice hockey defencemen